Coniothecium chomatosporum is an ascomycete fungus that is a plant pathogen. It is found on plants of the genus Malus and Pyrus.

References

External links 
 Index Fungorum
 USDA ARS Fungal Database

Fungal plant pathogens and diseases
Ascomycota enigmatic taxa
Fungi described in 1837